Batil is an Arabic word meaning falsehood, and can be used to describe a nullified or invalid act or contract according to the sharia. 

In contract law, the opposite of batil is sahih. Batil can be distinguished from fasid ("defective") in that a fasid contract might go through completion, whereas a batil contract would not.

References

Arabic words and phrases in Sharia
Islamic terminology
Sharia legal terminology